Jane F. McAlevey is an American union organizer, author, and political commentator.

Since June 2019, McAlevey is a Senior Policy Fellow of the University of California, Berkeley Labor Center. She was also named Strikes correspondent for The Nation magazine.

McAlevey has written three books about power and strategy and the essential role of workers and trade unions in reversing income inequality and building a stronger democracy:  No Shortcuts - Organizing for Power in the New Gilded Age (Oxford University Press, 2016), Raising Expectations and Raising Hell (Verso Books, 2012), and her third book, A Collective Bargain: Unions, Organizing, and the Fight for Democracy, which was published by Ecco Press in January 2020.

Early background
McAlevey was the youngest of nine children. Her mother died of BRCA#1 breast cancer when she was not yet in kindergarten. Her father was an executive of Rockland County, New York.

In high school, she organized student strikes and walk-outs over issues ranging from sexist gym requirements to stopping nuclear energy to the possible reinstatement of the draft. In 1984, while at the State University of New York at Buffalo, she was elected student body president. She went on to be the president of the statewide student union in New York’s public university system (called the Student Association of the State University of New York (SASU). She orchestrated the takeover of the SUNY state university headquarters, which resulted in the SUNY trustees voting to divest the university system from entities doing business in South Africa. It was the largest act of divestiture by anyone in the USA at that time.

Career
After traveling and working in Central America, McAlevey was recruited to move to California to work out of David Brower’s Earth Island Institute on a project aimed at educating the environmental movement in the United States about the ecological consequences of U.S. military and economic policy in Central America. She was co-director of EPOCA, the Environmental Project on Central America. After two years working on coalition building in the US and the international environmental movement, she was recruited to work at the Highlander Research and Education Center in New Market, Tennessee.

After the New Voices leadership came to power at the AFL-CIO in 1996, McAlevey was recruited by senior AFL-CIO leaders to work for their organizing department and head up an experimental multi-union campaign in Stamford Connecticut. The Stamford Organizing Project, her first foray into union organizing, developed a model for rank & file worker-based social movement unionism that McAlevey calls the "whole worker organizing approach."

From the AFL-CIO she became the national Deputy Director for Strategic Campaigns of the Health Care Division of the SEIU (2002 to 2004). From there she became Executive Director and Chief Negotiator in 2004 for SEIU Nevada, a state based union that had success in achieving employer-paid family healthcare, preventing the rollback of public pensions, and using an approach to contract negotiations that gives workers the right to sit in on their workplace negotiations.

McAlevey completed a doctorate in sociology at the Graduate Center, CUNY under the supervision of Frances Fox Piven and advised by James Jasper and Dan Clawson.

A strike in the McAlevey school is no symbolic gesture. Her method calls for sustained action involving large numbers of workers to put the maximum possible pressure on management.

Bibliography
Raising Expectations and Raising Hell, My Decade Fighting for the Labor Movement, published by Verso in 2012.
No Shortcuts: Organizing for Power in the New Gilded Age, published by Oxford University Press in 2016.
A Collective Bargain: Unions, Organizing, and the Fight for Democracy, published by Ecco Press in 2020.

References

External links
 
 Jane McAlevey's Page on The Nation

1964 births
21st-century American women writers
Activists from New York City
American social activists
American social justice activists
American women non-fiction writers
American women trade unionists
American women writers
Graduate Center, CUNY alumni
Living people
Trade unionists from New York (state)
University at Buffalo alumni
Writers about activism and social change
Writers from New York City